Halleria  is a genus of flowering plants in the family Stilbaceae described as a genus by Linnaeus in 1753.

Halleria  is native to eastern and southern Africa and to Madagascar.

Species
 Halleria elliptica L. - South Africa, Malawi
 Halleria ligustrifolia Baker - Madagascar
 Halleria lucida L. - South Africa, Malawi, Tanzania, Uganda
 Halleria ovata Benth. - South Africa

References

Lamiales genera
Stilbaceae
Flora of Africa